Ambrose Joel "Amby" Burfoot (born August 19, 1946) is a former American marathoner whose peak competitive years came in the late 1960s and early 1970s. He was the winner of the 1968 Boston Marathon. After retiring from competition, he became a running journalist and author. Burfoot was editor-in-chief at Runner's World for many years, and both writes for the magazine and serves as its editor-at-large.

Competition
Amby Burfoot grew up in Groton, Connecticut, where he started running at Fitch Senior High School. His high school coach, John J. Kelley (The "Younger"), was the 1957 Boston Marathon winner and two-time U.S. Olympic marathoner (1956 and 1960 Olympics,) and his influence led Burfoot to take up the marathon while still a collegian. In his senior year at Wesleyan University, where Burfoot was the roommate and teammate of Bill Rodgers, Burfoot won the Boston Marathon, but an injury caused by running a steeplechase race in a collegiate track meet later that spring prevented him from being fully prepared for that year's Olympic Trials marathon.

Burfoot's influence on Rodgers, who went on to win the Boston Marathon four times, provided a link in a four-athlete Boston tradition starting with John A. Kelley (The "Elder") and continuing through John J. Kelley and Burfoot to Rodgers. 

In the Fukuoka Marathon in Japan in December 1968, Burfoot ran a personal best time of 2:14:28.8, which was one second from the American marathon record at the time.

At its peak, Burfoot's training often included high mileage weeks of  done at a relatively slow pace. Burfoot was a vegetarian during his peak training years although this lifestyle had less to do with training than with what he felt was an ethical course of action.

As of 2015, he had run the Manchester Road Race 53 times in a row besting the streak of barefoot runner, Charlie "Doc" Robbins. In the process, he won Manchester nine times. Burfoot also continues to run the Boston Marathon at five-year intervals, marking his 1968 win. He ran the 2013 Boston Marathon but was stopped three-quarters of a mile from completion after a terrorist attack near the finish line. He has run Boston each year since returning for 2014, in what Burfoot calls "the most glorious marathon ever because of the great people of Boston."

Achievements
All results regarding marathon, unless stated otherwise

Journalism
In 1978, Burfoot joined Bob Anderson as East Coast editor for Anderson's publication, Runner's World magazine. 

In 1984, he covered the first Olympic marathon that women were allowed to participate in, when Joan Benoit Samuelson came into the Olympic Stadium ahead of the field and surprised media to win gold.

In 1985, when Runner's World was bought by Rodale, Inc. and moved was moved from Mountain View, California to Emmaus, Pennsylvania, he was named the executive editor.

In 1992, Runner's World published Burfoot's article, "White Men Can't Run," about the dominance of African athletes and athletes of African descent in professional athletics. The article was later republished in The Best American Sports Writing.

Books 
Burfoot, Amby, Runner's World Complete Book of Running (1999) Rodale, 
Burfoot, Amby, The Principles of Running: Practical Lessons from My First 100,000 Miles (1999) Rodale Press; 1ST edition ; New Ed edition (2003) 
Burfoot, Amby, The Runner's Guide to the Meaning of Life: What 35 Years of Running Has Taught Me About Winning, Losing, Happiness, Humility, and the Human Heart (2000) Rodale Press; 1ST edition  
Burfoot, Amby, Runner's World Complete Book of Beginning Running (2005) Rodale Press, 
Burfoot, Amby, First Ladies of Running: 22 Inspiring Profiles of the Rebels, Rulebreakers, and Visionaries Who Changed the Sport Forever (2016) Rodale Books, 
Burfoot, Amby, Run forever: Your Complete Guide to Healthy Lifetime Running (2018) Arena Sport,

See also

 List of winners of the Boston Marathon

References

External links
 Amby Burfoot
 Running Past profile
 Amby's Blog on Runnersworld.com
 
 Amby Burfoot quotes

1946 births
Living people
American male long-distance runners
American male marathon runners
People from Groton, Connecticut
American magazine editors
Wesleyan University alumni

Rodale, Inc.
Boston Marathon male winners